Bulgaria has submitted films for the Academy Award for Best International Feature Film since 1970. The award is handed out annually by the United States-based Academy of Motion Picture Arts and Sciences to a feature length motion picture produced outside the U.S. that contains primarily non-English language dialogue. It was not created until the 1956 Academy Awards, in which a competitive Academy Award of Merit was created for non-English speaking films, and has been given annually since.

Since 1970, Bulgaria has submitted twenty-eight films for consideration. No Bulgarian film has yet been nominated for an Oscar, although their 2009 submission was shortlisted for the 2010 Best Foreign Language Film award. All films were primarily in Bulgarian, apart from the 2019 submission, Ága, which was in Yakut.

As of 2007, the Bulgarian submission has been chosen by the newly formed Bulgarian National Film Council. Prior to 2007, the responsibility went to the Bulgarian National Council on Cinema. The Bulgarian films selected for this category generally fall into three categories- those submitted by the Communist People's Republic of Bulgaria (7 films, submitted for the 1972-1990 award ceremonies), those made during the Post-Communist transition period where film output was extremely limited (3 films, 1991-2000) and films made after the national film industry had recovered (11 films, 2001–present).

Submissions

Overview

Communist-era submissions (1971–89)

The People's Republic of Bulgaria deemed seven films worthy of Oscar consideration, choosing primarily apolitical films, particularly nationalist dramas showcasing Bulgarian history.

The most famous of these was “The Goat Horn”, a revenge drama based on a famous Bulgarian folktale and considered one of the greatest Bulgarian films of all-time. Set in the 18th century, four bandits rape and kill a woman in front of her husband and young daughter. The husband then raises his daughter as a boy, specifically to take revenge. “Khan Asparoukh”, is an epic 7th century drama about Bulgaria's greatest Emperor Asparoukh, who fought against the Byzantines and founded the Bulgarian nation. “Time of Violence” is a 17th-century tale about the invasion of a Christian region by the Janissaries- Bulgarian youths kidnapped as children by the Ottoman Turks and raised as Muslims in order to violently convert their home villages. The latter film was selected for the Oscars in the midst of the political turmoil that led to the Communist overthrow.

Three other dramas bordered on the surreal. Two films by Christo Christov were selected in the 1970s: “The Last Summer”, about a rural town whose residents are forced to go elsewhere when a new dam floods the area, and “The Barrier”, a romance between a middle-aged composer and the eccentric (insane?) woman to whom he gives shelter in his home. "Where Do We Go From Here?" is the story of a director cruelly manipulating 26 aspiring actors & actresses trying to win an acting competition.

The first-ever Bulgarian Oscar submission was the children's comedy film “Porcupines Are Born without Bristles”, which was selected in Fall 1971 to compete for the 1972 Oscars.

Post-communist transition period (1990–2000)

After the fall of Communism and the end of generous state subsidies, Bulgarian film output fell drastically. In 1999, not a single Bulgarian film was released. Those few films that were released took advantage of the new lack of censorship to harshly attack the excesses of the old regime. All three films submitted for consideration to the Oscars in this time period were anti-Communist films. Margarit & Margarita, the story of two rebellious youths who fall in love, was banned shortly before the 1989 Revolution and was released shortly after. The Well tells the story of how Communism was imposed with an iron fist after the end of the Second World War. The Canary Season is about the tragic life story of a woman as retold to her teenage son who wants to know the identity of his real father, in which she recounts her rape and forced marriage at the hands of the regime.

Since 2001
Prior to Letter to America, every movie on this list was produced by the respected film studio Boyana Film. Starting with America, films from the new and independent studios began to be chosen for the first time. As the number of internationally recognized Bulgarian films increased, multiple films began to be considered each year. In the 2006-2008 selections, four, five and three semi-finalists were considered respectively.

Since Fall 2000, Bulgaria has never failed to submit a film for consideration in the category. Three out of the ten films were directed by women, including one by Milena Andonova, the daughter of Goat Horn director Melodi Andonov.

Since 2006, nine Foreign Language Film contenders are shortlisted after an initial round of AMPAS screenings. Then a selection of Academy members in New York and Los Angeles determine the final five nominees. The World is Big and Salvation Lurks Around the Corner was among the nine films shortlisted in 2009, but it did not make the final five.

In 2022, Mother by Zornitsa Sofia was announced as the submission for the 95th Academy Awards. After asking the Academy of Motion Picture Arts and Sciences to confirm the film's eligibility, it was rejected for having more than 50% of its dialogue in English.

Recent films selected have covered a wide variety of genres, with a special emphasis on stories from the Bulgarian countryside.

 In Letter to America, a man from Sofia is required to visit the ancestral village of his childhood friend in search of a song that will help him recover from an accident suffered in the United States. 
 Fate As a Rat is a black comedy about three crass men living in a seaside town in the late 1980s. 
 Warming Up Yesterday's Lunch follows a documentary film crew into the forests of Macedonia to track down and interview an elderly woman with a fascinating family history. 
 Journey to Jerusalem is about two German-Jewish children escaping the Nazis who end up in Bulgaria during WWII, and the traveling theatrical troupe who tries to help them reach their relatives in Palestine.  
 Mila From Mars, arguably the most-awarded film in Bulgaria's recent cinematic history, follows a pregnant teen who escapes to a remote village to give birth to her child. 
 Stolen Eyes features an unlikely romance (of sorts) between an ethnic Bulgarian soldier and an ethnic Turkish woman during the Communist regime's assimilation campaign, in which thousands of Turks fled the country. 
 Monkeys in Winter is a female-driven film telling the stories of three women living 20 years apart, from the 1960s to the 1980s. 
 Warden of the Dead is the story of a telekinetic pre-teen who lives in a cemetery and how he brings together a father and daughter who have never known each other. 
 Zift is a black-and-white noir thriller with elements of black comedy, about a man convicted of a murder he didn't commit in 1940s pre-Communist Bulgaria, only to be released in the 1960s during the heyday of Communism.
 The World is Big and Salvation Lurks Around the Corner, the first Bulgarian film to be shortlisted for an Oscar, is a road movie about a Bulgarian grandfather and his amnesiac grandson taking a road trip around the Balkans.

Notes

References

Bulgaria
Academy Award